Jingde is a town of Debao County, Guangxi, China. , it administers the following 20 villages:
Duojing Village
Gugan Village
Linghuai Village
Yali Village
Duojiang Village
Mudong Village
Nanuan Village
Quyan Village
Longdong Village
Baning Village
Mi'an Village
Duolang Village
Longzheng Village
Fuping Village
Tuoliang Village
Dahong Village
Tuoxin Village
Nong'an Village
Zhongli Village
Niangui Village

References

Towns of Guangxi
Debao County
Towns and townships in Baise